Mink Cove  is a community in the Canadian province of Nova Scotia, located in the  Municipality of the District of Digby. in Digby County on Digby Neck.

References

 Mink Cove on Destination Nova Scotia

Communities in Digby County, Nova Scotia
General Service Areas in Nova Scotia